High-mobility group protein B3 is a protein that in humans is encoded by the HMGB3 gene.

References

Further reading

External links 
 
 PDBe-KB provides an overview of all the structure information available in the PDB for Human High mobility group protein B3 (HMGB3)

Transcription factors